The Czechoslovak Bishops' Conference, known after 1990 as the Bishops' Conference of Czechoslovakia, was an episcopal conference made up of the Catholic bishops in former Czechoslovakia before 1950 and from 1990 until the division of that country in 1993.

History
As an informal body with no strictly defined powers, the conference met until 1950, when its activities were paralyzed by internment of most bishops. The State Agency for Religious Affairs started to organize conferences of capitular vicars-general, the first of which was convened on the 15 February 1951. The policy was released in March 1968, and efforts were undertaken to resume the episcopal conference, but because of the invasion by Warsaw Pact troops during August 1968, the conference failed to resume its activities. As the role of bishops increased due to returning of some internees to their duties as ordinaries of dioceses in this period, the communist régime aiming at "normalization" in the 1970s sought to prevent a functional episcopal conference that would mean a closer collaboration of the bishops.

Re-establishment in 1990
As a legal person within the meaning of the Code of Canon Law of 1983, the body was established under the name of Bishops' Conference of Czechoslovakia only in the spring of 1990 (according to some sources, on April 17, others May 14). Its first chairman was elected Cardinal František Tomášek. It consisted of two independently acting Bishops' Colleges: the Bohemian-Moravian (Chairman :cs:Francis Radkovský) and the Slovak (Chairman Eduard Kojnok). The Bishops' Conference of Czechoslovakia also became an associate member of the Ecumenical Council of Churches in Czechoslovakia, where the bishops' conference at the discretion of Cardinal Tomasek was represented primarily by the former Vicar General of Archdiocese of Prague Antonín Liška. After the disintegration of Czechoslovakia in 1993, in the two newly independent states two Bishops' Conferences were established: the Czech Bishops' Conference and the Conference of Slovak Bishops.

See also
Catholic Church in the Czech Republic

References

Defunct episcopal conferences
Catholic Church in the Czech Republic
Catholic Church in Slovakia